The Maniyani (also known as Kolaya, Ayar, Konar, Iruman, Urali Nair in different area) is a Malayalam speaking Yadava community, native to Kerala state of South India. They are mainly distributed in Kozhikode, Palakkad, Kannur, Kasaragod and Wayanad districts. Their traditional occupation is tending cattle and cultivation.

Origin
The Maniyanis are believed to have come from the ancient Yadava clan and associate themselves closely with the god Krishna. They are believed to have settled in the northern part of Kerala after having migrated from Tulunad. Royal kingdoms of Travancore and Venad in Kerala are said to be originated from Yadava or Vrishni lineage.

Social life
The majority of the Maniyanis are concentrated in the districts of Kannur and Kasaragod. They follow similar birth, marriage & death customs and rituals like other Nair sub-castes. Even though they practice endogamy, they rarely do intermarry with other castes like Nambiar, Payyanur Poduval and Vaniya-Vattakad Nairs.

Kannangattu bhagavathi is the tutelary deity of Maniyanis. Kannangattu bhagavathi has permanent place in every Muchilot Bhagavathi temple since Maniyanis have special brotherly relationship with Vaniya-Vattakad Nairs.
Maniyanis also perform Poorakkali in Muchilot bhagavathi temples. Maniyani community is classified under OBC (Other Backward Classes) by the Government of Kerala.

References

Social groups of Kerala